Armenia–Spain relations refer to bilateral relations between Armenia and Spain. The importance of relations centers on the history of Armenians migration to Spain. Approximately 40,000 Armenians and their descendants reside in Spain.  Both nations are members of the Council of Europe.

History

Early relations
The first initial contact between Armenia and Spain took place in 1382 when deposed King Leo V from the Armenian Kingdom of Cilicia arrived to Spain seeking assistance from Spanish King John I of Castile to regain his kingdom. In Spain, Leo V received the title of Lord of Madrid and stayed in Spain until 1390 when King John I of Castile died. Throughout the centuries, Armenians arrived to Spain escaping war and uncertainties in their home country. Some Armenians partook in the age of exploration for Spain in the late 1400s and early 1500s.

During the Armenian genocide in 1915, most Armenians did not travel to Spain, but instead went to either France or former Spanish territories of Argentina and Uruguay. On 26 December 1991, Armenia regained independence after the Dissolution of the Soviet Union. On 27 May 1992, Armenia and Spain established diplomatic relations.

Modern relations
Bilateral relations can be considered excellent but still scarce. Since independence, over 20,000 Armenians have immigrated to Spain. In 2003, Spain opened an honorary consulate in Yerevan. In August 2010, Armenia opened a resident embassy in Madrid. In recent years, five Spanish provinces have recognized the Armenian genocide (Aragon, Balearic Islands, Basque Country, Catalonia and Navarre). In 2010, a memorial was erected in Mislata, Valencia, the first monument commemorating the Armenian genocide in Spain.

High-level visits

High-level visits from Armenia to Spain

 Foreign Minister Miguel Ángel Moratinos (June 2007 & March 2010)
 Foreign Minister José Manuel García-Margallo (April 2014)

High-level visits from Spain to Armenia

 Foreign Minister Vartan Oskanian (November 2000 & November 2007)
 Foreign Minister Eduard Nalbandyan (May & December 2010, June 2013)

Bilateral agreements
Both nations have signed several bilateral agreements, such as an Agreement on the reciprocal Promotion and Protection of Investments (1990); Agreement on international transportation by road (2000); Memorandum of Understanding in Tourism (2013); Agreement on the Avoidance of Double Taxation and Tax Evasion (2010) and an Agreement on Cultural, Educational and Scientific Cooperation (2013).

Trade

In 2015, trade between Armenia and Spain totaled €55.8 million Euros. Armenia's main exports to Spain include:  ores, slag and ash. Spain's main exports to Armenia include: ceramic products, preserved fruit and vegetables, perfume, rubber and meat.

Resident diplomatic missions
 Armenia has an embassy in Madrid.
 Spain is accredited to Armenia from its embassy in Moscow, Russia and maintains an honorary consulate in Yerevan.

See also 
 Foreign relations of Armenia
 Foreign relations of Spain
 Armenians in Spain
 Armenia–European Union relations

References 

 
Spain
Bilateral relations of Spain